Jason Douglas Rogers (born March 13, 1988) is an American professional baseball first baseman for the Lincoln Saltdogs of the American Association of Professional Baseball. He previously played in Major League Baseball (MLB) for the Milwaukee Brewers and Pittsburgh Pirates.

Career

Milwaukee Brewers

Rogers was drafted by the Milwaukee Brewers in the 32nd round of the 2010 Major League Baseball Draft out of Columbus State University. In 2013, he was the Brewers' Minor League Player of the Year after hitting .270/.346/.468 with 22 home runs. He was added to the 40-man roster on November 20, 2013. Primarily a first baseman, Rogers added third base as a secondary position prior to the 2014 season.

Rogers made his major league debut on September 2, 2014. On May 9, 2015, Rogers hit his first career home run, a three-run shot off of Chicago Cubs relief pitcher Phil Coke. He hit his second homer off of Francisco Liriano on June 9. In 86 games for Milwaukee in 2015, Rogers slashed .296/.367/.441 with 4 home runs and 16 RBI.

Pittsburgh Pirates
On December 17, 2015, Rogers was traded to the Pittsburgh Pirates for Keon Broxton and minor leaguer Trey Supak. After hitting .080/.303/.160, Rogers was designated for assignment on December 23, 2016. He was released on June 30, 2017 after beginning the year with the Triple-A Indianapolis Indians.

Hanshin Tigers
On July 7, 2017, Rogers signed with the Hanshin Tigers of Nippon Professional Baseball (NPB). Rogers hit .252/.329/.431 with 5 home runs and 23 RBI for the Tigers in 2017.

New Britain Bees

On April 6, 2018, Rogers signed with the Kansas City T-Bones of the American Association. On May 15, 2018, he was traded to the New Britain Bees of the Atlantic League of Professional Baseball. He became a free agent following the 2018 season. On January 3, 2019 The Blue Sox Facebook page announced Rogers was signed for the rest of the 2018/19 ABL season. On April 2, 2019, Rogers re-signed with the New Britain Bees for the 2019 season.

On November 6, 2019, Rogers was selected by the Somerset Patriots in the New Britain Bees dispersal draft. He didn't appear in a game for the club, as the season was canceled due to the COVID-19 pandemic. On June 29, 2020, Rogers's contract was purchased by the Olmecas de Tabasco of the Mexican League for the 2021 season. He participated in preseason with the club, but did not make the Opening Day roster.

Gastonia Honey Hunters
On May 27, 2021, Rogers signed with the Gastonia Honey Hunters of the Atlantic League of Professional Baseball. Rogers hit .317/.468/.517 with 3 home runs and 12 RBI in 17 games for the team before being released on June 19.

Algodoneros de Unión Laguna
On June 19, 2021, Rogers signed with the Algodoneros de Unión Laguna of the Mexican League. In 12 games, Rogers slashed .182/.265/.318 with 2 home runs and 4 RBIs. He was released by the team on July 5.

Gastonia Honey Hunters (second stint)
On July 9, 2021, Rogers re-signed with the Gastonia Honey Hunters of the Atlantic League of Professional Baseball. He became a free agent following the season.

Lincoln Saltdogs
On January 21, 2022, Rogers signed with the Lincoln Saltdogs of the American Association, taking on the role of a player-coach.

References

External links

Columbus State Cougars bio

1988 births
Living people
African-American baseball players
American expatriate baseball players in Japan
Arizona League Brewers players
Baseball players from Georgia (U.S. state)
Brevard County Manatees players
Colorado Springs Sky Sox players
Columbus State Cougars baseball players
Gigantes de Carolina players
Hanshin Tigers players
Helena Brewers players
Huntsville Stars players
Indianapolis Indians players
Milwaukee Brewers players
Nashville Sounds players
New Britain Bees players
Nippon Professional Baseball first basemen
People from East Point, Georgia
Pittsburgh Pirates players
Surprise Saguaros players
Sydney Blue Sox players
Tigres del Licey players
American expatriate baseball players in the Dominican Republic
Toros del Este players
Wisconsin Timber Rattlers players
Gastonia Honey Hunters players
Algodoneros de Unión Laguna players
Mexican League baseball first basemen
American expatriate baseball players in Mexico
American expatriate baseball players in Australia
21st-century African-American sportspeople
20th-century African-American people